The Metallurg Stadium is a football stadium in Samara, Russia, and is home  to Russian Premier League club FC Krylia Sovetov. Built in 1957, Metallurg Stadium has a capacity of 33,001 seats since its latest renovation. It has also been repeatedly awarded the VCSPS Diploma, which rates the quality of all sport complexes in Russia.

History

Construction 
On 7 November 1956, a construction company, 'Metallurgist', performing a construction of a factory at the time, announced that a new stadium was to be built. The stadium was then partially completed in 1957. The rapid completion of the stadium was due to the compatibility of two projects being completed at the same time: raw materials were being manufactured in the Lenin Kuibyshev Metallurg Factory and were delivered to the stadium directly.

Metallurg's official opening took place on 10 August 1957 with the uncompleted tribune being replaced by wooden benches, the capacity of which was around 8,000. The benches were not removed from the stadium until 1976.

First matches and tenants 
When Metallurg was first completed, it was the home stadium of FC Metallurg Kuibyshev and one of the home stadiums of Krylya Sovetov Samara reserve squad. On 6 July 1965, Metallurg became the official home stadium of Krylya Sovetov Samara, when 'Krylya' played their first official game on the stadium. The match took place in the Quarterfinals of the 1965 USSR Football Cup, where Krylya defeated Dinamo Saint Petersburg by three goals to one.

Metallurg became Krylya's domestic league home stadium on 2 May 1970.

Renovations and upgrades 
On 1976, the wooden benches were replaced by reinforced concrete seats on the stadium's tribune. 

During the following two off-seasons, the Western and the Northern sectors were constructed. The capacity of the stadium reached 38,000 seats. The first match with a heated pitch was played on 1 November 1997.

Awards 
Metallurg Stadium was repeatedly awarded the VCSPS Diploma in the period from 1970 to 1990. It was also assigned a 'category B' class by the Russian Football Union, which allowed the Metallurg Stadium to host any competitions, held by the aegis of the Russian Football Union.

The certificate expired on 1 June 2012.

References

Sports venues completed in 1957
PFC Krylia Sovetov Samara
Football venues in Russia
Sports venues built in the Soviet Union
Buildings and structures in Samara Oblast
1957 establishments in Russia